Gandhada Gudi Part 2 is a 1994 Indian Kannada-language adventure film directed by Vijay and produced by M. P. Shankar. A sequel to Gandhada Gudi (1973), the film stars Shiva Rajkumar, Tiger Prabhakar, Rajeshwari and Charan Raj. Actor Rajkumar, who featured in the prequel as the main lead, made a brief appearance in the film. The film's soundtrack was composed by Rajan–Nagendra.

Cast 
 Rajkumar as Kumar in a special appearance
 Shiva Rajkumar
 Rajeshwari
 Tiger Prabhakar
 Charan Raj 
 Tara
 K. S. Ashwath
 Advani Lakshmi Devi 
 B. Jaya

Soundtrack 
The soundtrack of the film was composed by Rajan–Nagendra.

References

External links 
 

1994 films
1990s Kannada-language films
Indian adventure drama films
Indian sequel films
Films scored by Rajan–Nagendra
1990s adventure drama films
Films directed by Vijay (director)